Myosin VIIA and Rab interacting protein is a protein that in humans is encoded by the MYRIP gene.

References

Further reading